A Man Before His Time is a 1971 Soviet drama film directed by Abram Room. It is based on Yakov Bogomolov, an unfinished play by Maxim Gorky (ca. 1916).

Plot 
The film is set in the Karadag coast of the Crimea at the turn of the 20th century. It tells about the engineer Bogomolov, who is so passionate about his work that he does not notice how his wife cheats on him and his friends betray him.

Cast 
 Igor Kvasha as Yakov Bogomolov
 Anastasiya Vertinskaya as Olga Borisovna
 Aleksandr Kalyagin as Nikon Bukeyev
 Boris Ivanov as Uncle Jean
 Nina Shatskaya as Nina Arkadyevna
 Valentin Smirnitskiy as Boris Ladygin
 Irina Varley as Verochka
 Anatoliy Adoskin as Naum
 Tatyana Lukyanova as Dunyasha

References

External links 
 

1971 films
1970s Russian-language films
Soviet drama films
Films based on works by Maxim Gorky
1971 drama films